The 1992–93 East Carolina Pirates men's basketball team represented East Carolina University during the 1992–93 NCAA Division I men's basketball season. The Pirates, led by second-year head coach Eddie Payne, played their home games at Williams Arena at Minges Coliseum and were members of the Colonial Athletic Association (CAA). They finished the season 13–17, 4–10 in CAA play to finish in seventh place. They won the CAA tournament to receive the conference's automatic bid to the 1993 NCAA tournament. As No. 16 seed in the East region, the Pirates were beaten in the opening round by No. 1 seed and eventual National champion North Carolina, 85–65.

Roster

Schedule

|-
!colspan=9 style=| Regular season

|-
!colspan=9 style=| CAA tournament

|-
!colspan=9 style=| 1993 NCAA tournament

References

East Carolina Pirates men's basketball seasons
East Carolina
East Carolina
East Carolina Pirates
East Carolina Pirates